Umut Sözen (born 27 January 1990) is a Turkish footballer who plays as an attacking midfielder for Vanspor.

References

 5 OYUNCUYLA YOLLAR AYRILDI !, spor.haber3.com, 28 December 2015

External links
 
 

1990 births
Footballers from İzmir
Living people
Turkish footballers
Turkey youth international footballers
Turkey under-21 international footballers
Turkey B international footballers
Association football midfielders
Ankaraspor footballers
MKE Ankaragücü footballers
Kayserispor footballers
Kardemir Karabükspor footballers
Manisaspor footballers
Adana Demirspor footballers
Altınordu F.K. players
Gençlerbirliği S.K. footballers
Fethiyespor footballers
Sakaryaspor footballers
Adanaspor footballers
Karacabey Belediyespor footballers
Vanspor footballers
Süper Lig players
TFF First League players
TFF Second League players